Talal Abdullah (Arabic:طلال عبد الله) (born 28 March 1994) is an Emirati footballer. He currently plays as a defender for Al Arabi.

External links

References

Emirati footballers
1994 births
Living people
Ajman Club players
Al-Shaab CSC players
Sharjah FC players
Al Hamriyah Club players
Al-Arabi SC (UAE) players
UAE First Division League players
UAE Pro League players
Association football defenders